cWOW Gallery, also known as City Without Walls Gallery, is located in Newark, New Jersey,  occupying a building on Halsey Street at Crawford Street in the Lincoln Park/The Coast Cultural District.

City Without Walls is New Jersey's oldest not-for-profit alternative art space, in continuous operation since 1975 with a "two-fold mission offers career development opportunities to new and emerging artists, while providing the public a chance to understand and enjoy challenging contemporary art." The alternative art space relies on members to curate their on-site and off-site gallery spaces, cWOW, which stands for City Without Walls, has an estimated 6-10 exhibitions per year. It also runs three educational programs called City Murals, Newark New Media, and ArtReach.

cWOW operates a gallery in the atrium of One Newark Center. Both spaces are on the citywide Open Doors Studio Tour.

See also
City Without Walls
Aljira, a Center for Contemporary Art
Newark Museum

References

External links

Culture of Newark, New Jersey
Tourist attractions in Newark, New Jersey
Art museums and galleries in New Jersey
Buildings and structures in Newark, New Jersey